Beatrice Funke Ogunmola (born February 15, 1980) is a film producer, screenwriter and actress also referred to as BFO. Ogunmola received awards from the Toronto International Nollywood Film Festival (TINFF) for Best Movie Producer and Best Nollywood Female Filmmaker. The film Love Castle  which she produced received four awards out of ten nominations, including three awards at the Toronto International Nollywood Film Festival  in Ontario, Canada, in October 2021, and at the Abuja International Film Festival in Nigeria.

Filmography

Accolades
In 2021, Ogunmola received multiple awards for producing the film Love Castle.

References

External links 

 Website

Living people
Yoruba actresses
21st-century Nigerian actresses
Nigerian film producers
1980 births
Nigerian screenwriters
People from Ondo State